Heinrich Schmelz (24 February 1930 in Vienna) is a former Austrian politician (Austrian People's Party) and federal civil servant. Schmelz was member of the Austrian Parliament from 1977 to 1988.

References

External links 
 

1930 births
Living people
Austrian People's Party politicians
Austrian civil servants
Members of the Austrian Parliament